Liú (留) s a Chinese surname. It is not among the 400 most common surnames in China according to the 2013 Fuxi Culture Research Association study.

Notable people
 Liu Zan (留贊, 183–255), courtesy name Zhengming, a military general of the state of Eastern Wu during the Three Kingdoms period of China
 Liu Congxiao (Chinese: 留從效, 906-962), formally the Prince of Jinjiang, was a general of the Chinese Five Dynasties and Ten Kingdoms Period state Min
 Liu Shaozi (留紹鎡) was a nephew of Liu Congxiao, a warlord late in the Chinese Five Dynasties and Ten Kingdoms Period

References 

Individual Chinese surnames
Chinese-language surnames not found in the Hundred Family Surnames